The 1926 Buckrose by-election was a parliamentary by-election for the British House of Commons constituency of Buckrose, Yorkshire on 5 May 1926. This was the first by-election to take place during the General Strike.

Vacancy
The by-election was caused by the resignation of the sitting Unionist MP, Sir Guy Gaunt on 20 February 1926. He was cited as co-respondent in the divorce case between Sir Richard Cruise and his wife. He had been MP here since winning the seat in 1922.

Election history
The constituency was created in 1885 and had been in the hands of the Liberal Party for most of the time before the Unionists won in 1922. A Labour candidate had only ever stood here once before, in 1918. The result at the last General Election was

Candidates
On 12 April, the Buckrose Unionist Association chose 33-year-old Albert Braithwaite DSO, MC as their candidate to defend the seat. He was the son of Albert Braithwaite, one time Lord Mayor of Leeds and Patti Braithwaite. He was educated at Woodhouse Grove School, Leeds Grammar School and the University of Leeds.  He served in the Yorkshire Hussars during World War I and was appointed a member of the British Military Commission to the USA. He was awarded a DSO in 1918. 
The Buckrose Liberal Association adopted 45-year-old Sir Harry Verney as their candidate to challenge for the seat. Verney succeeded in the baronetcy in May 1910. In the December general election of the same year he was returned to Parliament for Buckingham, a seat he held until 1918. He served under H. H. Asquith as Parliamentary Secretary to the Board of Agriculture and Fisheries from 1914 to 1915. Verney married Rachel Gwenyfyr Catherine, daughter of Victor Alexander Bruce, 13th Earl of Kincardine, in 1911. After his defeat at Buckingham in 1918, Verney had made a number of attempts to re-enter parliament. He stood as Liberal candidate in the 1920 Basingstoke by-election, he stood as Liberal candidate for Skipton at the 1922 and 1923 general elections and Banbury at the last election in 1924.
The Buckrose Constituency Labour Party had selected Lt. Herbert Cecil Laycock MC as their prospective candidate back in February 1926. He came from Burnley and lived in Leeds. He was standing for parliament for the first time.

Campaign
Nominations closed on 27 April. Polling Day was set for 5 May 1926.

Result
The Unionists hung onto the seat by a reduced margin;

Aftermath
Braithwaite retained the seat at the following General Election;

Neither Verney not Laycock stood for parliament again.

See also
 List of United Kingdom by-elections
 United Kingdom by-election records

References

Buckrose by-election
By-elections to the Parliament of the United Kingdom in Yorkshire and the Humber constituencies
Buckrose by-election
Buckrose by-election
1920s in the East Riding of Yorkshire